Theophilus Alphonso Pinson (born November 5, 1995) is an American professional basketball player for the Dallas Mavericks of the National Basketball Association (NBA). He played college basketball for the North Carolina Tar Heels. A  swingman, Pinson was the starting shooting guard for the Tar Heels' 2017 NCAA championship team.

High school career

Born and raised in Greensboro, North Carolina, Pinson played high school basketball for Wesleyan Christian Academy in nearby High Point. He was named a McDonald's All-American in his senior year. In the summer of 2011, Pinson was named to the USA Basketball U16 team, where he won the gold medal with future Tar Heel teammate Justin Jackson.

College career
Pinson's college career was marked by injury early, as he broke the fifth metatarsal bone in his left foot and missed 14 games of his freshman season. His sophomore season was injury free; however, he broke the same bone (fifth metatarsal) in his right foot, causing him to miss the first 16 games of his junior season. While on the court, Pinson's passing, defense and leadership played a key role in the Tar Heels' run to consecutive National Championship Title Games. Pinson was also acknowledged as a positive factor in the locker room for these teams, as he developed a reputation as a prankster in both the locker room and with the media. During the Tar Heels' 2017 championship run, Pinson's playmaking helped the team defeat Kentucky in the South Regional Final, as his full-court drive and pass set up a game-winning shot by forward Luke Maye. As a senior, he averaged 10.3 points, 6.5 rebounds and 5.1 assists in 29.7 minutes per game.

Professional career

Brooklyn Nets (2018–2020)
After going undrafted in the 2018 NBA draft, Pinson joined the Brooklyn Nets for the 2018 NBA Summer League. He posted 11.2 points, 4.0 rebounds, and 2.2 assists per game in five summer league games. On August 6, 2018, Pinson signed a training camp contract with the Nets, which was confirmed to be a two-way contract for the 2018–19 season. Under the terms of the deal, he will split time between the Nets and their NBA G League affiliate, the Long Island Nets. Pinson made his NBA debut on October 20, 2018, in a 132–112 loss to the Indiana Pacers, scoring two points with a rebound and two assists in six and half minutes of play. On April 10, 2019, the Nets converted Pinson's two-way deal to a full NBA contract. On April 15, Pinson made his postseason debut scoring 9 points shooting 3 for 5 from the field and 3 for 4 from 3. On July 8, 2019, the Nets re-signed Pinson to a reported two-year contract, after the Nets rescinded their qualifying offer to Pinson on July 6.

In December 2019, Pinson began to see more minutes for the Nets due to an Achilles injury to David Nwaba. On February 4, 2020, Pinson scored 32 points to go with nine rebounds, three assists and two steals in the G League as the Long Island Nets defeated the Wisconsin Herd 117–110. On June 23, Pinson was waived by the Nets.

New York Knicks (2020–2021)
Three days later after leaving the Brooklyn Nets, on June 26, 2020, Pinson was claimed off waivers by the New York Knicks.

On November 19, 2020, the Knicks announced that they did not exercise the team option on Pinson, making him a free agent. On November 29, the Knicks re-signed Pinson to a two-way contract with the Westchester Knicks.

Maine Celtics (2021)
Pinson joined the Milwaukee Bucks for the 2021 NBA Summer League.

On September 28, 2021, Pinson signed with the Boston Celtics, but was waived at the end of training camp. On October 23, he signed with the Maine Celtics as an affiliate player. Pinson averaged 16.4 points, 4.4 assists, 4.6 rebounds, and 1.3 steals per game.

Dallas Mavericks (2021–present)
On December 20, 2021, Pinson signed a 10-day contract with the Dallas Mavericks.  He signed a second 10-day contract with the Mavericks on December 31. He signed a two-way contract on January 10, 2022.

On July 1, 2022, Pinson re-signed with the Mavericks on a one-year deal.

Career statistics

NBA

Regular season

|-
| style="text-align:left;"|
| style="text-align:left;"|Brooklyn
| 18 || 0 || 11.7 || .342 || .261 || .864 || 2.0 || 1.2 || .3 || .0 || 4.5
|-
| style="text-align:left;"|
| style="text-align:left;"|Brooklyn
| 33 || 0 || 11.1 || .290 || .188 || .938 || 1.6 || 1.7 || .5 || .1 || 3.6
|-
| style="text-align:left;"|
| style="text-align:left;"|New York
| 17 || 0 || 2.0 || .111 || .000 || .000 || .3 || .1 || .0 || .0 || .1
|-
| style="text-align:left;"|
| style="text-align:left;"|Dallas
| 19 || 0 || 7.8 || .359 || .333 || 1.000 || 1.1 || .9 || .3 || .1 || 2.5
|- class="sortbottom"
| style="text-align:center;" colspan="2"|Career
| 87 || 0 || 8.7 || .308 || .226 || .917 || 1.3 || 1.1 || .3 || .1 || 2.9

Playoffs

|-
| style="text-align:left;"|
| style="text-align:left;"|Brooklyn
| 3 || 0 || 7.3 || .375 || .429 ||  || 1.0 || 1.0 || .7 || .0 || 3.0
|- class="sortbottom"
| style="text-align:center;" colspan="2"|Career
| 3 || 0 || 7.3 || .375 || .429 ||  || 1.0 || 1.0 || .7 || .0 || 3.0

College

|-
| style="text-align:left;"|2014–15
| style="text-align:left;"|North Carolina
| 24 || 1 || 12.5 || .368 || .269 || .611 || 3.0 || 1.5 || .6 || .2 || 2.8
|-
| style="text-align:left;"|2015–16
| style="text-align:left;"|North Carolina
| 40 || 7 || 18.7 || .420 || .290 || .636 || 3.2 || 2.9 || .6 || .3 || 4.8
|- 
| style="text-align:left;"|2016–17
| style="text-align:left;"|North Carolina
| 21 || 13 || 23.8 || .381 || .237 || .702 || 4.6 || 3.7 || .9 || .2 || 6.1
|-
| style="text-align:left;"|2017–18
| style="text-align:left;"|North Carolina
| 37 || 37 || 29.7 || .473 || .226 || .818 || 6.5 || 5.1 || 1.1 || .5 || 10.3
|- class="sortbottom"
| style="text-align:center;" colspan="2"|Career
| 122 || 58 || 21.7 || .431 || .257 || .734 || 4.4 || 3.4 || .8 || .3 || 6.3

References

External links

North Carolina Tar Heels bio
USA Basketball bio

1995 births
Living people
21st-century African-American sportspeople
African-American basketball players
American men's basketball players
Basketball players from Greensboro, North Carolina
Brooklyn Nets players
Dallas Mavericks players
Long Island Nets players
Maine Celtics players
McDonald's High School All-Americans
New York Knicks players
North Carolina Tar Heels men's basketball players
Shooting guards
Small forwards
Texas Legends players
Undrafted National Basketball Association players